I'll Wait for You is a 1941 American drama film directed by Robert B. Sinclair and written by Guy Trosper. The film stars Robert Sterling, Marsha Hunt, Virginia Weidler, Paul Kelly, Fay Holden and Henry Travers. A re-make of the 1934 film Hide-Out, it was released on May 16, 1941, by Metro-Goldwyn-Mayer.

Plot

Injured while escaping from two detectives who have apprehended him, womanizing gangster Jack Wilson hides out in the country with the Millers, a kind, trustworthy farm family who are unaware of his identity. As Jack slowly warms to the Millers and life on the farm, he falls in love with beautiful Pauline and determines to change his ways and pay for his past.

Cast

References

External links 
 

1941 films
1941 romantic drama films
American black-and-white films
Remakes of American films
American romantic drama films
Films set in Connecticut
Films set in New York City
American gangster films
Metro-Goldwyn-Mayer films
Films directed by Robert B. Sinclair
1940s English-language films
1940s American films